Pitch may refer to:

Acoustic frequency
 Pitch (music), the perceived frequency of sound including "definite pitch" and "indefinite pitch"
 Absolute pitch or "perfect pitch"
 Pitch class, a set of all pitches that are a whole number of octaves apart
 Relative pitch, the ability to identify a given musical interval between two notes
 Pitch accent, a form of accentuation in speech

Business
 Sales pitch, a line of talk that attempts to persuade someone or something
 Pitch (filmmaking), a proposal for a film
 Elevator pitch, a very short sales presentation, allegedly short enough to be made during an elevator ride

Measurement

Movement about the transverse axis 
 Pitch angle (or pitch rotation), one of the angular degrees of freedom of any stiff body (for example a vehicle), describing rotation about the side-to-side axis
 Pitch (aviation), one of the aircraft principal axes of rotation (nose-up or nose-down angle measured from horizontal axis)
 Pitch (ship motion), one of the ship motions' principal axes of rotation (bow-up or bow-down angle measured from horizontal axis)

Angle measurement
 Pitch or grade (slope), the steepness of a slope or an object confirming to a slope
 Roof pitch relates to the slope and inclination angle
 Pitch, or rake, in geology, the angle between a line and the strike of the plane on which it was found

Electromagnetism 
 Pitch angle (particle motion), the angle between a charged particle's velocity vector and the local magnetic field

Mechanical engineering 
 Pitch angle (engineering), the angle between a bevel gears' element of a pitch cone and its axis

Linear measurement
"Pitch" is widely used to describe the distance between repeated elements in a structure possessing translational symmetry:

 Pitch (gear), the distance between a point on one tooth and the corresponding point on an adjacent tooth
 Pitch (screw) the distance between turns of a screw thread
 Blade pitch the distance between the front edge and the rear edge of a propeller blade
 Pitch, the distance between passes in the helical scanning pattern of X-ray computed tomography
 Pitch (typewriter), the number of characters and spaces in one inch (25.4 mm) of running text
 Pitch, the distance between bits in a parallel integrated circuit element such as a register file
 Dot pitch in images
 Pin pitch, the distance between centers of pins in electronics packaging
 Seat pitch, the spacing between seat rows in an aircraft

Arts, entertainment, and media
 Pitch (film)
 Pitch (TV series)
 Pitch Weekly, a free urban weekly newspaper in Kansas City

Plants
 Pitch (resin), a viscous substance produced by plants or formed from petroleum
 Pitch Pine (Pinus rigida), trees

Sports and recreation 
 Pitch (ascent/descent), a term used in climbing and also caving
 Pitch (baseball), a throw of a baseball from a pitcher to the catcher(s)
 Pitch (card game) (or "High, or Low Jack"), an American trick-taking card game
 Pitch (sports field), a field of play and is usually outdoors
 Cricket pitch
 Rugby pitch
 Football pitch
 The bounce of a cricket ball
 Pitch, a lateral pass in gridiron football
 Pitching, the process of assembling a tent

See also
 Pitch Black (disambiguation)
 Pitcher
 Pitchfork
 Pitchware
 "Pitchy", a song by Basshunter from his Calling Time album
 The Pitch (disambiguation)